Amy L. Landers is an American lawyer, currently at Drexel University and formerly a Distinguished Professor at University of the Pacific.

References

Year of birth missing (living people)
Living people
Drexel University faculty
University of the Pacific (United States) faculty
American lawyers
University of California, Hastings College of the Law alumni
Rochester Institute of Technology alumni